Patient Education and Counseling is a monthly peer-reviewed medical journal covering patient education and health communication, especially counseling. It was established in 1979 as Patient Counselling and Health Education, obtaining its current name in 1983. It is the official journal of the European Association for Communication in Healthcare (EACH), as well as the American Academy on Communication in Healthcare. It is published by Elsevier and the editor-in-chief is Arnstein Finset (University of Oslo). According to the Journal Citation Reports, the journal has a 2015 impact factor of 2.232.

References

External links

Elsevier academic journals
Publications established in 1979
Monthly journals
Healthcare journals
General medical journals
English-language journals
Academic journals associated with international learned and professional societies of Europe
Academic journals associated with learned and professional societies of the United States